Anahila Lose Kanongata'a-Suisuiki  (born 1969) is a New Zealand politician and Member of Parliament in the House of Representatives for the Labour Party.

Early life and career
Kanongata'a-Suisuiki was born in Tonga. When she was a child her single mother went to work in New Zealand, leaving her children in the custody of her father. When her mother and stepfather became permanent residents, she came to New Zealand in 1980 and settled in a state house in Onehunga. Kanongata'a-Suisuiki later worked as a senior executive at the Ministry of Social Development and was on the national executive of P.A.C.I.F.I.C.A Incorporated.

Political career

She was placed 37 on the party list.

In 2019, Kanongata'a-Suisuiki served on the Abortion Legislation Committee which considered the Abortion Legislation Act, that proposed eliminating most legal restrictions on abortion in New Zealand. She opposed the bill during all three readings of the bill in Parliament, which subsequently passed into law in March 2020.

In the 2020 New Zealand general election, she contested the Papakura electorate, challenging Judith Collins, the Leader of the Opposition. Kanongata'a-Suisuiki lost to Collins by a final margin of 5,583 votes. However, she returned to Parliament on the Labour Party list.

In March 2021, Kanongata'a-Suisuiki voted against the proposed Contraception, Sterilisation, and Abortion (Safe Areas) Amendment Act 2022, claiming that the creation of safe areas around abortion providers amounted to the "erosion of freedom of expression." She also voted against the bill during its second and third readings in 2022.

References

Living people
1969 births
Tongan emigrants to New Zealand
New Zealand Labour Party MPs
Members of the New Zealand House of Representatives
21st-century New Zealand women politicians
New Zealand list MPs
Women members of the New Zealand House of Representatives
Unsuccessful candidates in the 2011 New Zealand general election
Unsuccessful candidates in the 2014 New Zealand general election
Candidates in the 2020 New Zealand general election